The Stoke City Player of the Year award is an award presented to the Stoke City fans' player of the season. Towards the end of each season, fans are invited to cast their votes for this award. The winner is generally announced at an end-of-season awards dinner at either the Bet365 Stadium or the King's Hall in Stoke-on-Trent.

The inaugural award was made to Howard Kendall in 1978. Peter Fox has won the award a record three times, Mickey Thomas and Jack Butland are the only other players to have once the award more than once. There have been 13 different nationalities to have won the award.

Key
  denotes multiple recipients in the same season
 Player (X) denotes the number of times a player has won the award

Player of the Year winners

Wins by playing position

Wins by nationality

References

External links
 Stoke City Player of the Year at stokecityfc.com

Players
Association football player of the year awards by club in England
Association football player non-biographical articles